Bradford Hotel may refer to:
 Bradford Hotel (Sedan, Kansas), listed on the NRHP in Kansas
 Bradford Hotel (New York, New York)
 Bradford Hotel (Lisbon, North Dakota), listed on the NRHP in North Dakota